Prince Józef Aleksander Jabłonowski (1711–1777) was a Polish nobleman (szlachcic).

Józef became Stolnik of Lithuania in 1744, voivode of Nowogródek Voivodeship from 1755 to 1776 and starost of Busk, Ukraine, Korsuń, Dźwinogród, Wołpenia, Rakancin and Ławara. He founded the Societas Jablonoviana (Towarzystwo Naukowe Jablonowskich) – "Science Society of the Jablonowski Family".

He died in 1777 and was buried in the Pleissenburg Castle in Leipzig, Germany.

Secular senators of the Polish–Lithuanian Commonwealth
Polish bibliographers
1711 births
1777 deaths
Jozef Aleksander Jablonowski
Members of the Académie des Inscriptions et Belles-Lettres